Stuck in the Middle is an American family comedy television series developed by Alison Brown and Linda Videtti Figueiredo and created by Alison Brown that premiered on Disney Channel on February 14, 2016. The series focuses on Jenna Ortega as Harley Diaz, who invents many gadgets to deal with living in a large family. In addition to the regular episodes, the series also aired six shorts on December 16, 2016. After three seasons and 57 episodes, the series concluded with the episode "Stuck in Harley's Quinceañera" on July 23, 2018.

Series overview

Episodes

Season 1 (2016)

Season 2 (2017)

Season 3 (2017–18)

Stuck in the Store (2016) 
 Stuck in the Store is a Stuck in the Middle special that aired on Disney Channel on December 16, 2016, consisting of six 2–4-minute shorts.

References 

Lists of American children's television series episodes
Lists of American comedy television series episodes
Lists of Disney Channel television series episodes